Communist Russia may refer to:
 Russian Soviet Federative Socialist Republic, the biggest republic of the Soviet Union, 1918–1991
 Union of Soviet Socialist Republics, commonly known as the Soviet Union, 1922–1991

See also 
 All-Russian Communist Party (Bolsheviks)
 Soviet Russia (disambiguation)